C D Deval (born December 30, 1938) is an Indian politician, Congress leader and former IAS officer from Rajasthan. He has served as the Member of Rajasthan Legislative Assembly from the Raipur Constituency during 2003-08. He entered administrative service first as a Tehsildar and selected for RAS in 1963. In 1984, he was promoted to the IAS. He retired as an IAS officer in 1996.

During his tenure as RAS officer, he was twice elected as the President of RAS Officers Association. Since 2013, he has been leading Marwar Prantiya Charan Mahasabha, a social organization of the Charan community.

References 

Indian National Congress politicians from Rajasthan
Living people
People from Pali district
Rajasthan MLAs 2003–2008
1938 births
Charan
Indian Administrative Service officers